The Eastern Orthodoxy in Europe constitutes the second largest Christian denomination. European Eastern Orthodox Christians are predominantly present in Eastern and Southeastern Europe, and they are also significantly represented in diaspora throughout the Continent. The term Eastern Orthodox Europe is informally used to describe the predominantly Eastern Orthodox countries of Eastern Europe, as well as, Belarus, Bulgaria, Cyprus, Georgia, Greece, Moldova, Montenegro, Republic of North Macedonia, Romania, Russia, Serbia and Ukraine.

History
Almost all of Eastern Orthodox Europe became part of communist states after World War II.

Eastern Orthodoxy in Orthodox majority countries
Eastern Orthodoxy in Moldova, 97.0% (2017 census)
Eastern Orthodoxy in Greece, 90%
Eastern Orthodoxy in Serbia, 84.6% (2011 census)
Eastern Orthodoxy in Romania, 81.0% (2015 census) 
Eastern Orthodoxy in Georgia, 83.4% (2014 census)
Eastern Orthodoxy in Cyprus, 73.2% 
Eastern Orthodoxy in Bulgaria, 77% (2011 census)
Eastern Orthodoxy in Montenegro, 72.1% (2011 census)
 Eastern Orthodoxy in North Macedonia, 69.6%
Eastern Orthodoxy in Russia, 79%
Eastern Orthodoxy in Ukraine, 67.3%
Eastern Orthodoxy in Belarus, 73% (2011 census)

Eastern Orthodoxy in non-Orthodox majority countries
Eastern Orthodoxy in Bosnia and Herzegovina, 31.0% (2013 census)
Eastern Orthodoxy in Albania, 20%
Eastern Orthodoxy in Latvia, 19.4% (2011 census)
Eastern Orthodoxy in Estonia, 16.15% (2011 census) 
Eastern Orthodoxy in Austria, 8.8% (2018 census)
Eastern Orthodoxy in Lithuania, 4.9% (2011 census)
Eastern Orthodoxy in Croatia, 4.44% (2011 census)
Eastern Orthodoxy in Italy, 3.5% 
Eastern Orthodoxy in Germany, 2.4%
Eastern Orthodoxy in Slovenia, 2.3% (2002 census)
Eastern Orthodoxy in Spain, 2.2% (by Wikipedia)
Eastern Orthodoxy in Poland, 1.5% (by Wikipedia)
Eastern Orthodoxy in the Republic of Ireland, 1.3% (2017)
Eastern Orthodoxy in Finland, 1.09%  (2020 census)
Eastern Orthodoxy in Slovakia, 0.9% (2011 census)
Eastern Orthodoxy in Norway, 0.22% (2012)
Eastern Orthodoxy in Hungary, 0.1% (2011 census)
Eastern Orthodoxy in Armenia, 0.1% (2011 census)

See also
Byzantine commonwealth
Mount Athos

References

Sources